The women's 3000 metres event  at the 1992 European Athletics Indoor Championships was held in Palasport di Genova on 1 March.

Results

References

3000 metres at the European Athletics Indoor Championships
3000
1992 in women's athletics